Murray Bernthal (April 15, 1911 – December 9, 2010) was an American musician and producer long active in Syracuse, New York.  He was a violin prodigy and a Syracuse University basketball player.

Bernthal and his first wife, Rose, were instrumental in saving the Landmark Theatre during the 1970s when local developers threatened to tear it down.

Bernthal received the Post-Standard Achievement Award from The Post-Standard, a Syracuse news publisher in February 1995.

References

External links
 Famous Artists Broadway
Famous Artists maestro Murray Bernthal has taken his last bow, Syracuse New Times, 12-14-2010

1911 births
2010 deaths
Jewish American musicians
Jewish men's basketball players
Musicians from Syracuse, New York
Syracuse University College of Visual and Performing Arts alumni
21st-century American Jews